White carrot may refer to:

 White varieties of the common carrot (Daucus carota subsp. sativus)
 Arracacha, an Andean root vegetable sometimes called white carrot

See also
Other root vegetables are similar in appearance to a white carrot, and may be called "white carrot" in other languages, though not in English:
 Daikon, the large East Asian white radish. 

 Parsnip